Philippe Caillard (born 1924 in Paris) is a French choral conductor, professor of music education, technical and pedagogical advisor to the Ministry of Youth and publisher of choral music.

He made about thirty recordings exclusively for Erato Records, fifteen of which received a grand prix du disque.

He specialized in teaching choir direction and pedagogy, and founded a vocal ensemble that bears his name, originally specialized in works of Renaissance music, but whose repertory has grown over the years. He transcribed and edited ancient vocal music.

He has directed various professional choirs of European radio stations and given many concerts in international festivals at the head of his choir.

External links 
 Philippe Caillard, Chef des chefs de chœurs on Avantchoeur.com
 Philippe Caillard
 Éditions Philippe Caillard
 Chorale Philippe Caillard Discographie on Discogs
 Le Jeune / Philippe Caillard Vocal Ensemble, 1960: Three Polyphonic Chansons on YouTube

French choral conductors
French male conductors (music)
1924 births
Musicians from Paris
Living people
21st-century French conductors (music)
21st-century French male musicians